is a Japanese voice actress who works for Aoni Production.

Notable voice roles

Anime
Kaka in Dragon Quest
Kumomaru and Kirimaru in Anpanman
Kiki in Beyblade
Ichiro in Crayon Shin-chan
Roboka and Chinchao in Doraemon
Kaka in Dragon Quest
Trigger in Kurogane Communication
Toguru in Mushrambo (Shinzo)
Shibuki in Nintama Rantarou
Maruru and Misa in Nurse Angel Ririka SOS
Nana Baruburan in Remi the Homeless Girl
Carlo in Romeo no Aoi Sora
An Ohara (31) and other additional voices in Sailor Moon
Yu Yamanami in Soul Link

Games
Kurreshes in Black Matrix
Da Qiao and Xiao Qiao in the Dynasty Warriors series
Sawtooth in the Wacky Races series (3DO Games)

Dubbing
Patty in Practical Magic

External links
 
 

1967 births
Living people
Voice actresses from Kanagawa Prefecture
Japanese voice actresses
Aoni Production voice actors
20th-century Japanese male actors
21st-century Japanese male actors